Football (futbol) is the most popular sport in Bulgaria. It was introduced in 1893–1894 by Swiss gymnastics teachers invited to the country. A football (initially called ритнитоп, ritnitop, "kickball") match was first played in Varna's High School for Boys in 1894, where it was introduced by Georges de Regibus, and the game was brought to Sofia by Charles Champaud the following year. The rules of the game were published in Bulgarian by Swiss teachers in the Uchilishten pregled magazine in 1897, and football continued to gain popularity in the early 20th century. Among the founders of the Turkish team Galatasaray in 1905 was the Bulgarian Lycée de Galatasaray student Blagoy Balakchiev, and the first Bulgarian club, Futbol Klub, was established in Sofia in 1909 on the initiative of Sava Kirov. Botev Plovdiv was founded in 1912, Slavia Sofia in 1913, and Levski Sofia in 1914. The Bulgaria national football team debuted on 21 May 1924 in a 1924 Summer Olympics qualifier, losing 0–6 to Austria in Vienna. What is today CSKA Sofia was established on 5 May 1948. In the 1950s and 1960s Bulgarian football achieved its biggest Olympic success, being third in the 1956 Summer Olympics in Melbourne and second in the 1968 Summer Olympics in Mexico City, also finishing fifth in Euro 1968. In 1962, Bulgaria first qualified for a FIFA World Cup tournament, in total of seven participations to date. In the 1986 FIFA World Cup, Bulgaria did reach the round of 16. Then, in the 1994 FIFA World Cup, came Bulgaria's biggest World Cup success, the fourth place, the elimination of reigning world champions Germany and Hristo Stoichkov's top goalscorer prize. Bulgaria is also three times European champion in under-19, three times Balkan champion, and three times Balkan Youth champion. The titles won by the national team make Bulgaria one of the best performing nations in European football competitions.

Bulgarian football competitions
 Championships:
 Top division: First League - 14 teams
 Second division: Second League - 16 teams
 Third division: Third League - 4 groups with 12-18 teams each
 Fourth division: Regional Groups - divided by region
 Cup: Bulgarian Cup
 Super Cup: Bulgarian Super Cup
 AFL Cup: Cup of Bulgarian Amateur Football League

Crime and corruption 

Between 2003 and 2013, 15 club presidents or previous owners of Bulgarian top league clubs were murdered. A US diplomatic cable of 2010 published by WikiLeaks claimed that since the end of Communism, allegations of illegal gambling, match fixing, money laundering, and tax evasion abound in Bulgarian football, which has become a symbol of organised crime's corrupt influence on important institutions.

See also
 List of football clubs in Bulgaria
 List of football stadiums in Bulgaria
 Bulgaria national football team
 Bulgaria national under-21 football team
 Bulgaria national under-19 football team
 Bulgarian Football Union
 Bulgarian Footballer of the Year
 Bulgarian Professional Football League

References